Robin François De Hert (20 September 1942 – 24 August 2020) was a Belgian film director.

De Hert won the André Cavens Award for Best Film in 2000, with his film Lijmen/Het Been.

He died on 24 August 2020 at the age of 77 due to complications of diabetes.

Movies
Camera Sutra (1973)
De Witte van Zichem (1980)
Le filet américain (1981)
Maria Danneels of Het leven dat we droomden (1982)
Trouble in Paradise (1989)
Blueberry Hill (1989)
Brylcream Boulevard (1995)
Elixir d'Anvers (1997)
Gaston's War (1997)
Lijmen/Het Been (2000)
Hollywood aan de Schelde (2018)

References

External links

 

1942 births
2020 deaths
Flemish film people
Belgian film directors
People from Farnborough, Hampshire
Ark Prize of the Free Word winners
Deaths from diabetes
English people of Belgian descent